Total Devastation is a hip hop group consisting of Rasta Redeye and Big Tone. They have sold over 60,000 copies of their debut single "Many Clouds of Smoke" in California.

History

Initially consisting of Rasta Redeye (born in Puerto Rico), Da Soopa Dupa (born in Cuba), and DJ Tuf Cut Tim the Fat Beat Maker (born in Mexico), the group released their self-titled debut studio album in 1993. "Many Clouds of Smoke" was released as a single from the album. Their second studio album, The Stone Age, was released in 1998 with members of the group reduced to two – Rasta Redeye and Big Tone (formerly known as Da Soopa Dupa).

Discography

Albums

Singles

References

Hip hop groups from California
Musical groups from San Francisco
Musical groups established in 1988
1988 establishments in California